Bambama is a district and the smallest in the Lékoumou Region of the Republic of the Congo. The capital lies at Bambama.

Towns and villages
Bambama

References

Lékoumou Department
Districts of the Republic of the Congo